Billinghay is a village and civil parish in the North Kesteven district of Lincolnshire, England. Just south of the village towards Sleaford is North Kyme. According to the 2001 census the parish had a population of 1,808, increasinging to 2,190 at the 2011 census, increasinging to 2,203 at the 2021 census. 
 
The settlement is mentioned in the Domesday Book. The name originates from a Saxon name for a fishery. The topography in ancient times would have been that of a small settlement on a gravel mound surrounded by marsh which was flooded in winter. After the draining of the fens in the late 18th century the area became rich agricultural land as it is today. The parish church is of historic interest. It dates from the 13th century.

Billinghay Grade I listed Anglican parish church is dedicated to St Michael and All Angels. The parish is part of the Car Dyke group of parishes - including Tattershall Bridge.

After the phased closure of Lafford High School due to falling pupil numbers, Billinghay Primary School remains the only school in the village.

In 1986 village was twinned with Ballon, in the Sarthe department of France.

References

External links

 Village website
 Parish council
 Car Dyke group of parishes

Civil parishes in Lincolnshire
North Kesteven District
Villages in Lincolnshire